MQP may refer to:
 Kruger Mpumalanga International Airport, a South African airport
 Mandatory quote period, a term used on the London Stock Exchange
 Michael Quinn Patton, a leading evaluation theorist